The 1960 United States presidential election in Maryland took place on November 8, 1960, as part of the 1960 United States presidential election. State voters chose nine representatives, or electors, to the Electoral College, who voted for president and vice president.

Maryland was won by Senator John F. Kennedy (D–Massachusetts), running with Senator Lyndon B. Johnson, with 53.61% of the popular vote against incumbent Vice President Richard Nixon (R–California), running with United States Ambassador to the United Nations Henry Cabot Lodge, Jr., with 46.39% of the popular vote.

This is the last time the losing candidate won a majority of Kent County votes. This also marks the last time the Democratic candidate won a majority of the vote in Dorchester County, as it would become the only County in Maryland to flip from supporting Kennedy to supporting Goldwater and vote Republican until it was flipped by a plurality in 1996 into the Democratic column.

Results

Results by county

Counties that flipped from Democratic to Republican
Baltimore (City)
Calvert
Charles
Dorchester
Montgomery
Prince George's
Queen Anne's
St. Mary's

See also
 United States presidential elections in Maryland
 1960 United States presidential election
 1960 United States elections

Notes

References 

Maryland
1960
Presidential